Mohammed Ariful Islam may refer to:
 Mohammed Ariful Islam (footballer)
 Mohammed Ariful Islam (swimmer)